Windows Server 2019 is the ninth version of the Windows Server operating system by Microsoft, as part of the Windows NT family of operating systems. It is the second version of the server operating system based on the Windows 10 platform, after Windows Server 2016. It was announced on March 20, 2018 for the first Windows Insider preview release, and was released internationally on October 2, 2018. It was succeeded by Windows Server 2022 on August 18, 2021.

Development and release 
Windows Server 2019 was announced on March 20, 2018, and the first Windows Insider preview version was released on the same day. It was released for general availability on October 2 of the same year.

On October 6, 2018, distribution of Windows 10 version 1809 (build 17763) was paused while Microsoft investigated an issue with user data being deleted during an in-place upgrade. It affected systems where a user profile folder (e.g. Documents, Music or Pictures) had been moved to another location, but data was left in the original location. As Windows Server 2019 is based on the Windows version 1809 codebase, it too was removed from distribution at the time, but was re-released on November 13, 2018. The software product life cycle for Server 2019 was reset in accordance with the new release date.

Editions 
Windows Server 2019 consists of the following editions:

 Windows Server 2019 Essentials - intended for companies up to and including 25 employees, memory-limited.
 Windows Server 2019 Standard - intended for companies with more than 25 employees or more than 1 server to separate server roles.
 Windows Server 2019 Datacenter - is mainly used for placing multiple virtual machines on a physical host.

Features 
Windows Server 2019 has the following new features:
 Container services:
 Support for Kubernetes (stable; v1.14)
 Support for Tigera Calico for Windows
 Linux containers on Windows
 Storage:
 Storage Spaces Direct
 Storage Migration Service
 Storage Replica
 System Insights
 Security:
 Shielded Virtual Machines 
 Improved Windows Defender Advanced Threat Protection (ATP) 
 Administration:
 Windows Admin Center
 SetupDiag
 OpenSSH included

Web browser 
Microsoft Edge did not support Server 2019 at release. Microsoft considers Internet Explorer 11 a "compatibility layer," not a browser.  Edge added support in January 2020, but Server 2019 does not install it by default.  Microsoft encourages server and enterprise users to install Edge.

See also 
 Microsoft Servers
 Comparison of Microsoft Windows versions
 Microsoft Windows version history
 Comparison of operating systems
 List of operating systems

References 

Windows Server
X86-64 operating systems